The 1993–94 Northern Football League season was the 96th in the history of Northern Football League, a football competition in England.

Division One

Division One featured 17 clubs which competed in the division last season, along with three new clubs, promoted from Division Two:
 Dunston Federation Brewery
 Eppleton Colliery Welfare
 Shildon

League table

Division Two

Division Two featured 17 clubs which competed in the division last season, along with two new clubs relegated from Division One:
 Easington Colliery
 Peterlee Newtown

Also, Darlington Cleveland Bridge changed name to Darlington Cleveland Social.

League table

References

External links
 Northern Football League official site

Northern Football League seasons
1993–94 in English football leagues